Charaxes eurialus is a butterfly of the family Nymphalidae. It is found on Ambon Island, Serang and Saparua in Indonesia.

The wingspan is about 50 mm. It is a large dark brown, almost black butterfly with concave forewings decorated with a yellow transverse band and hindwings with a tail, a white marginal band, a submarginal line of black spots pupillated with white and then a blue band.

References

eurialus
Butterflies described in 1779
Endemic fauna of Indonesia